This list of tallest buildings in Fort Lauderdale ranks skyscrapers in Fort Lauderdale, Florida, by height. The heights of buildings includes architectural details (permanent parts) but excludes antennas. The tallest building in the city of Fort Lauderdale is 100 Las Olas, which is 152m (499 feet) tall and has 46 floors. Despite being the largest city in Broward County, the tallest building in the county is actually the  Beach Club Tower 2 in Hallandale Beach. However, numerous buildings taller than both of these are planned, and several are approved for construction. See list of tallest proposed, approved, or under construction below.

Tallest Buildings Completed
This article lists most downtown buildings taller than 61 meters (200 feet).

Tallest Buildings Proposed, Approved, or Under Construction

See also
 List of tallest buildings in Florida
 List of tallest buildings in Jacksonville
 List of tallest buildings in Miami
 List of tallest buildings in Miami Beach
 List of tallest buildings in Orlando
 List of tallest buildings in St. Petersburg
 List of tallest buildings in Sunny Isles Beach
 List of tallest buildings in Tampa

References

 List
Fort Lauderdale
Fort Lauderdale
Tallest in Fort Lauderdale